Chechens in France is a small diaspora but one of the most important groups in the Chechen diaspora.

History 
The Chechen immigrants came to France as political refugees in the early 2000s, fleeing from the war in their home.  Today, there are approximately 67,000 Chechens in France, making it the largest community among the Chechen diaspora in Europe.
Known to be a very discreet community since their arrival in France in the 2000s, the Chechens have been suffering from prejudice and bad reputation since 2020 with  the events of the Dijon riots and the Murder of Samuel Paty murdered by a young Chechen refugee.
The prejudices that Chechen immigrants are subjected to refer to the image of physically violent people with a clannish culture, and of fundamentalist Muslims or even radical Islamists.

See also  
 2020 Dijon riots

References

Chechen diaspora
Society of France
 
Immigration to France by country of origin
European diaspora in France